Anuradha is an Assamese language drama film directed by Rakesh Sharma and starring Meghranjani and Diganta Hazarika in the lead roles.
The film was produced by Luit Kumar Barman under the banner of M L Entertainment and Cine Dream Unlimited, and released on 27 March 2015.

Plot 

The movie is based on the central character Anuradha (Meghranjani). It is about a woman abandoned by her husband to lead an unexpected solitary life in the laps of nature. The movie showcases different inner conflicts in various female characters in a male dominated Indian society. This movie explores different female mythological characters of Indian culture like Kunti, Shakuntala, Chitangada, Supornakha etc. and analyse their relevance to the common present day women.

Cast
 Meghranjani 
 Diganta Hazarika
 Joy Kashyap 
 Pranami Bora
 Suruj Kalita 
 Taniya Nandy
 Nayan Saikia

Production
Story, dialog and screenplay of the film is the director's own. The editor of the film is Ratul Deka. Executive producer is Diganta Saikiya. Cinematography by Suruz Deka. Main assistant director is Anupam Baisya .

Soundtrack

Music director of the film Anuradha is Geet Priyam. The singers are Zubeen Garg, Angaraag Mahanta, Rupam Bhuyan, Prarthona Gogoi, Anita Borthakur and Sourabh Mahanta. The music and lyrics of this movie is composed by Geet Priyam. Renowned singers like Zubeen Garg, Angaraag Mahanata and others have contributed in the music album. The songs "Boi Jua" by Angaraag Mahanta is being considered as one of the best Assamese songs of 2014. All the other songs were also well received by audience with the positive response. The music of the album was released on 14 February 2014 by Prafulla Kumar Mahanta, former Chief Minister of Assam.

References

2015 films
Films set in Assam
2010s Assamese-language films